Pineda is a Spanish and Catalan toponymic surname. Literally meaning "pine grove" or "pine forest", it is derived from the name of several places in Asturias, Barcelona, Burgos, and Cuenca. Notable people with the surname include:

Alex Pineda Chacón (born 1969), Honduran football (soccer) player
Alonso Álvarez de Pineda (died 1519), Spanish explorer
Álvaro Pineda (1945–1975), Mexican jockey
Amado Pineda (1938–2015), Filipino meteorologist
Antonio Pineda (1751–1792), Guatemalan botanist
Jose Antonio Pineda, Salvadoran beat poet, film actor and author
Arnel Pineda (born 1967), Filipino-American singer-songwriter
Allan Pineda Lindo (born 1974), Filipino-American rapper and member of The Black Eyed Peas
Charee Pineda (born 1990), Filipina actress
Daniella Pineda (born 1987), Mexican-American actress
Eliza Pineda (born 1995), Filipina child actress
Empar Pineda (born 1944), Spanish feminist activist
Gonzalo Pineda (born 1982), Mexican football player
Israel Pineda (born 2000), Venezuelan baseball player
Iván de Pineda (born 1977), Argentine fashion model and film actor
John de Pineda (1558–1637), Spanish Jesuit theologian
Luis Pineda (born 1974), Dominican-born Major League baseball player
Laureano Pineda (1802–1853), President of Nicaragua in 1851
Mariana de Pineda Muñoz (1804–1831), Spanish national heroine
Marianna Pineda (1925–1996), American sculptor
Mauricio Pineda (born 1975), Argentine football player
Michael Pineda (born 1989), Dominican baseball player
Michel Pineda (born 1964), French footballer
Orbelín Pineda (born 1996), Mexican football player
Orlando Pineda (born 1986), Mexican football player
Pablo Pineda Gaucín (c. 1961–2000), assassinated Mexican crime reporter
Paulina Margarita Gálvez Pineda (born 1980), Colombian beauty pageant winner
Rafael Pineda (television journalist) (born 1937), Spanish language television news anchor
Rafael Pineda (boxer) (born 1966), Colombian boxer
Roberto Pineda (1952–1978) Mexican jockey
Salvador Pineda (born 1952), Mexican actor
Yael Pineda (born 1992), Mexican footballer

Fictional characters
Dorina Pineda, a fictional character in Bituing Walang Ningning

References

Catalan-language surnames
Spanish-language surnames
Toponymic surnames